Bitelaria is a monospecific genus of extinct vascular plants described from outcrops of the Early Devonian Campbellton Formation in New Brunswick, Canada and Middle Devonian outcrops in the Voronezh region of Russia. B. dubjanski is characterized by thick-walled, dichotomously branched tubular axes and thick cuticles with possible lenticel-like eruptions. The unusual external morphology of the plant distinguishes it from other vascular plants and is thus placed in Tracheophyta incertae sedis.

See also
Devonian
List of Early Devonian land plants
Polysporangiophytes

References

Early Devonian plants
Paleozoic life of New Brunswick
Prehistoric plant genera